Shiori Murakoso (born 12 June 1996) is a Japanese professional footballer who plays as a defender for WE League club Omiya Ardija Ventus.

Club career 
Murakoso made her WE League debut on 12 September 2021.

References 

Living people
1996 births
Women's association football defenders
Japanese women's footballers
Association football people from Saitama Prefecture
Omiya Ardija Ventus players
WE League players